Thomas Wilson Williamson (August 4, 1887 Hiawatha, Kansas – November 16, 1974) was a Kansas architect who specialized in designing school buildings in Kansas, Iowa, and Missouri.

Williamson grew up in Topeka, Kansas and is best known for designing Topeka High School, a magnificent Perpendicular Gothic public high school, completed in 1931. Assisting Williamson was his chief designer Ted Greist, and Linus Burr Smith from Kansas State College (now Kansas State University) to oversee the plans.

Williamson and Griest also designed Clay Elementary School (now Cair Paravel-Latin School), which was completed in 1926.

Thomas W. Williamson (1887-1974), whose full name was Thomas Wilson Williamson, was an American architect.  He practiced architecture for more than 50 years, designing schools and courthouses in Kansas and neighboring U.S. states.  A number of his works were listed on the U.S. National Register of Historic Places for their architecture.  Firm names including him operated as Thomas W. Williamson and Company, as Thomas W. Williamson, Victor H. Loebsack & Associates, and later as Williamson-Loebsack and Associates.  The firm grew to a size of 46 architects, draftsmen, engineers and other specialists.

Early life
He was born in 1886 or 1887 in Hiawatha, Kansas. He graduated from Topeka High School in 1907.  He then attended the University of Pennsylvania and graduated with an A.B. degree from its school of architecture and returned to Kansas in 1911. He worked briefly for the Kansas state architect's office and for one year for architect John F. Stanton (whose El Dorado Carnegie Library is NRHP-listed).  He then opened his own practice in 1912.

Career
He designed schools.

He designed courthouses.

He designed the Jayhawk Theater and linked hotel in Topeka in 1926.

Works
Works include (with attribution to self or firm):
Cheyenne County Courthouse (1924–25), 212 E. Washington St., St. Francis, Kansas (Williamson, Thomas W. & Co.), NRHP-listed
Jayhawk Hotel, Theater and Walk (1926), 700 Jackson Ave., Topeka, (Williamson,Thomas W.), NRHP-listed
Topeka High School (1931 campus), 800 SW 10th Ave., Topeka, (Williamson, Thomas W.), NRHP-listed
Washington Grade School (1938), 209 S. Locust St. Pittsburg, Kansas (Williamson, Thomas W. & Co.), NRHP-listed
 
Central Motor and Finance Corporation Building, 222 W. 7th St., Topeka, Kansas (Williamson,Thomas W.), NRHP-listed
Curtis Junior High School, 316 NW Grant St., Topeka, (Williamson, Thomas Wilson), NRHP-listed
Fire Station No. 2--Topeka, 719-723 Van Buren, Topeka, (Williamson, Thomas Wilson), NRHP-listed
Hiawatha Memorial Auditorium, 611 Utah St., Hiawatha, Kansas (Williamson,Thomas W.), NRHP-listed
Sumner Elementary School and Monroe Elementary School, 330 Western Ave. and 1515 Monroe St., Topeka, (Williamson,Thomas W.), NRHP-listed

References

Bibliography
William Elsey Connelley, History of Kansas, State and People, (1928) 
United States Department of the Interior, National Park Service, National Register of Historic Places submission for Topeka High School, Shawnee County, Kansas, (22 April 2005)

External links

Kansas Memory: Thomas Wilson Williamson, Kansas Historical Society

1887 births
1974 deaths
20th-century American architects
People from Hiawatha, Kansas
Architects from Kansas
People from Topeka, Kansas